Heliocentric is the fifth studio album by Paul Weller, released in 2000.

It peaked at No. 2 on the UK Albums chart.

Production
Heliocentric was produced by Brendan Lynch. Its name was inspired by the Helios desk used in the recording studio.

The string arrangements were contributed by Robert Kirby.

Critical reception
Exclaim! wrote: "Infuriatingly, relentlessly dull, [the album] suggests that Weller is not only dry of opinions and melodies, but disengaged from the very concept of fresh ideas." The Guardian called the album "a mustering of forces, as if [Weller]'s suddenly realised that coasting on his reputation as Mr Authentically Gritty won't keep those automatic Brit awards coming in." The New Zealand Herald called it "a solid, often dense, and musicianly collection that in its acoustic-framed songs echoes Wildwood."

Track listing
The original album cover has a printing mistake which shows tracks 4 & 5 in the wrong order. The correct order is shown below.

All tracks composed by Paul Weller

 "He's the Keeper"
 "Frightened"
 "Sweet Pea, My Sweet Pea"
 "A Whale's Tale"
 "Back in the Fire"
 "Dust and Rocks"
 "There's No Drinking, After You're Dead"
 "With Time & Temperance"
 "Picking Up Sticks"
 "Love-Less"

Personnel
Paul Weller – vocals, guitar, piano
Cliff Stapleton – hurdy-gurdy
Steve Cradock – guitar
Dominic Kelly – oboe
Brendan Lynch – keyboards, percussion
Steve White – drums
Damon Minchella – bass
Robert Kirby – string arrangements

References

2000 albums
Paul Weller albums
Albums arranged by Robert Kirby
Island Records albums